Western Suburbs Soccer Club was an Australian professional association football club based in Sydney. The club was formed in 1964 and became one of 14 founding members of the National Soccer League in 1977 after spending their first 13 seasons in the New South Wales football tiers. 

The club's first team spent two seasons in the National Soccer League, six in the top division of New South Wales, four in the second and three in the lower tiers of New South Wales football. Their worst league finish was 10th in the inter-suburban second tier, their placing at the end of the 1965 season. The table details the club's achievements in major competitions, and the top scorers for each season.

History
Western Suburbs' first team started competitive football in the 1964 season in NSW Amateur Division B (the fourth tier of New South Wales football) finishing 7th as the league disbanded at the end of the season and was moved to the NSW Inter Suburban Division Two the following season in 1965 where the team was relegated to NSW Inter Suburban Division Three, but was promoted to the NSW Federation Division Two in 1966. The next four seasons were played in the second tier until they were promoted to the first tier in 1970 winning the club's first competitive honour.

When they entered the NSW Ampol Cup, their first Ampol Cup was won in 1971 winning 4–2 against Marconi-Fairfield in the Final. while also entering their first State Cup the same season. Their final competitive honour came in the 1976 NSW Ampol Cup as the following season had the team enter Australia's first national competitive season in the National Soccer League in 1977 where the team finished 5th out 14 which had the next season play their last season as club in 1978 finishing 9th and qualifying for the Quarter-Finals of the 1978 NSL Cup.

Key
Key to league competitions:

 National Soccer League (NSL) – Australia's former top football league, established in 1977 and dissolved in 2004.
 NSW Federation Division One (Div 1) – The first tier of football in New South Wales.
 NSW Federation Division Two (Div 2) – The second tier of football in New South Wales.

 NSW Inter Suburban Division Two (Inter Div 2)
 NSW Inter Suburban Division Three (Inter Div 3)
 NSW Amateur Division B (Amateur B)

Key to colours and symbols:

Key to league record:
 Season = The year and article of the season
 Pos = Final position
 Pld = Matches played
 W = Matches won
 D = Matches drawn
 L = Matches lost
 GF = Goals scored
 GA = Goals against
 Pts = Points

Key to cup record:
 En-dash (–) = Western Suburbs did not participate
 R1 = First round
 R2 = Second round, etc.
 QF = Quarter-finals
 SF = Semi-finals
 RU = Runners-up
 W = Winners

Seasons

References
General
 

Specific

Western Suburbs SC